Der Angriff  (in English "The Attack") is a discontinued German language newspaper founded in 1927 by the Berlin Gau of the Nazi Party. The last edition was published on 24 April 1945.

History
The newspaper was set up by Joseph Goebbels, who in 1926 had become the Nazi Party leader (Gauleiter) in Berlin, and the party provided most of the money needed to ensure publication.  The paper was first founded to rally NSDAP members during the nearly two-year ban on the party in Berlin.  Der Angriff was conceived as a mass circulation paper that fought the hated "System" with rude and aggressive language.  Antiparliamentarism and antisemitism were its self-defining themes.  The most regular contributors were party functionaries; lead articles were usually written by the publisher, Goebbels, until 1933, and signed "Dr. G."  Willi Krause, using the pen name Peter Hagen, was its first editor-in-chief. He was succeeded first by Julius Lippert, then in 1933 by Karoly Kampmann, and from 1935, by Goebbels's trusted friend Hans Schwarz van Berk.  A further attraction of the paper were the political caricatures by Hans Schweitzer.

Der Angriff was first published on 4 July 1927 by the Angriff Press.  Its motto was "For the oppressed against the exploiters".  At first appearing once a week, then starting 1 October 1929 twice a week, Der Angriff became a daily newspaper with the subtitle "The German Evening Paper in Berlin" after 1 November 1930.  After 1 October 1932 it published twice daily as "The Attack at Noon" and "Night Attack".  After 1 February 1933, it appeared as the "Daily Newspaper of the German Labor Front" from the Eher Press, with Goebbels remaining as the publisher.  It contained principally party propaganda, agitation against the Weimar Republic, and antisemitism; among many others it regularly attacked Bernhard Weiss, the deputy head of the Berlin police, who was Jewish. For this it was temporarily banned on 4 November 1931 by Albert Grzesinski, Berlin's chief of police.

Circulation of the newspaper was small during its first three years, but grew dramatically after the Reichstag election of September 1930. There were almost 60,000 readers by the end of 1930, about 80,000 in March 1931, and 110,600 on the eve of the July 1932 Reichstag election, after which circulation began a decline. After the Nazis gained political power in Germany on 30 January 1933, the importance of the newspaper slowly decreased. When the Allies started the bombing campaign against Berlin, the circulation was increased to keep up the morale of Berliners.  After 19 February 1945 Der Angriff was merged with the Berliner Illustrierte Nachtausgabe (Berlin Illustrated Night Edition).  The last edition was published on 24 April 1945.

Related publications
Nacht-Angriff was a daily paper also published by Goebbels. Issues in 1932 are described as "6. Jahrgang" (Year 6).
Der Gegen-Angriff: antifaschistische Wochenschrift (The Counterattack: anti-fascist weekly newspaper) was an anti-fascist weekly published in Prague between 1933 and 1936 (139 weekly issues); and there were also Parisian and Swiss editions.

In popular culture
In the 1942 film Casablanca, a Nazi civilian whom Rick bars from his casino angrily says that he will report the snub to Der Angriff.
In the 1968 episode "War Take a Holiday" of the TV sitcom Hogan's Heroes, Colonel Hogan uses a false copy of Der Angriff to perpetrate a hoax that an armistice has been declared.
In the 1984 made-for-TV film The Jesse Owens Story, Der Angriff posted derogatory opinion regarding the African-American athletes competing at the 1936 Summer Olympics in Berlin.

See also
Other newspapers of Nazi Germany:
Berliner Arbeiterzeitung ("Berlin Workers Newspaper"), Gregor and Otto Strasser's newspaper, representing the Strasserite wing of the Nazi Party
Illustrierter Beobachter ("Illustrated Observer"), illustrated companion to the Völkischer Beobachter
Panzerbär ("The Panzer Bear"), a tabloid Nazi newspaper intended for the troops defending Berlin from the Red Army
Das Reich, a weekly newspaper founded by Goebbels
Das Schwarze Korps ("The Black Corps"), the official newspaper of Heinrich Himmler's Schutzstaffel (SS)
Der Stürmer ("The Stormer"), Julius Streicher's Nuremberg-based virulently antisemitic and frequently semi-pornographic newspaper
Völkischer Beobachter ("People's Observer"), the official Nazi newspaper, published in Munich

References
Notes

Bibliography
 Russel Lemmons: Goebbels and Der Angriff, 1994,  (Google Books preview).
 Peter Stein: "Die NS-Gaupresse 1925-1933 Forschungsbericht - Quellenkritik - neue Bestandsaufnahme", 1987, 
 Joseph Goebbels: "Der Angriff. Aufsätze aus der Kampfzeit" (Der Angriff - Essays from the Time of Struggle), Munich, 1935. Reprint of the essays in book form. Scanned version online.
Christian Zentner, Friedemann Bedürftig (1991). The Encyclopedia of the Third Reich, p. 24.  Macmillan, New York.

External links
 Several pre-1933 essays by Goebbels from Der Angriff

1927 establishments in Germany
1945 disestablishments in Germany
Newspapers established in 1927
Publications disestablished in 1945
Nazi newspapers
20th century in Berlin
Newspapers published in Berlin
Joseph Goebbels